Amaryllis is a female ancient Greek name and derives from the Ancient Greek verb amarýssō (ἀμαρύσσω), meaning "sparkle, shine".

Origin
The name appears in Ancient Greek and Roman literature. In Theocritus' Idylls, a goatherd sings a serenade outside the cave of the nymph Amaryllis. Amaryllis was also the name of a heroine in Virgil's pastoral poem Eclogues. The Amaryllis flower is named after her.

Amaryllis is not a very popular name in Greece, nor in other countries. It has been included in the Greek Orthodox calendar only recently, meaning there is a name day for Amaryllis, which is October 10.

References

Given names derived from plants or flowers
Greek feminine given names